The 2019 Hokkaido gubernatorial election was held on 7 April 2019 to elect the next Governor of Hokkaido Prefecture. After serving four terms, incumbent Governor Harumi Takahashi decided not to seek re-election. The election resulted in a landslide victory for Naomichi Suzuki, the former mayor of Yūbari, who won 62% of the popular vote. His opponent, Tomohiro Ishikawa, had the support of CDP, JCP, SDP and DPFP, but only managed to secure 37% of the vote.

Candidates 
Tomohiro Ishikawa, backed by the opposition parties CDP, JCP, SDP, DPFP - former member of the House of Representatives.
Naomichi Suzuki backed by LDP and Komeito - former mayor of Yūbari, Hokkaido

Declined 
Seiji Osaka - member of the House of Representatives
 - broadcaster
Iehiro Tokugawa - 19th head of the Tokugawa clan
 - director of the Ministry of Land, Infrastructure, Transport and Tourism Hokkaido Bureau.
Seiko Hashimoto - member of the House of Councillors

Results

References

External links 
H31投開票速報（一般＿知事＿候補者別得票数） ｜ 北海道選挙管理委員会

2019 elections in Japan
Hokkaido gubernational elections